Zla Kolata is one of the highest of the Accursed Mountains, on the border of Montenegro and Albania.

Description 
It is located on the border of the Gusinje municipality of Montenegro and the Tropojë district of Kukës County, Albania. Zla Kolata has an enormous summit and is a popular tourist destination in both countries. The highest peak on this massif is a kilometer east-southeast of Zla Kolata and is completely on Albanian soil; it is called Rodi e Kollatës or Maja e Kollatës. It rises to 2,552 m (8,373 ft); but despite the dramatic views into the Valbona Valley, is not as often visited.

References 

Mountains of Montenegro
Mountains of Albania
International mountains of Europe
Albania–Montenegro border
Accursed Mountains
Highest points of countries
Valbonë Valley National Park